James Hutchins Robson (23 September 1895 – 3 December 1975) was an Australian politician. He was the Labor member for Hartley in the New South Wales Legislative Assembly from 1956 to 1965.

Robson was born in Newcastle upon Tyne in England to George Robson, a drayman, and Jane Ann Mackay. He began working in the mines in 1909 and enlisted in the Northumberland Fusiliers in 1914. In 1927 he and his family arrived in Australia, settling in Lithgow where Robson continued to work as a miner. He joined the Australian Labor Party in 1927 and was president of the federal electorate council for Macquarie, directing Ben Chifley's local campaigns. He was also vice-president of the Federated Ironworkers' Association, and was a member of Lithgow Council from 1947 to 1956.

In 1956, Robson was selected as the Labor candidate for the state seat of Hartley; sitting Independent Labor MP Jim Chalmers was contesting Nepean. Robson won the seat by 132 votes against Independent Labor candidate William Black. In 1962 he held on only narrowly against Independent Harold Coates; he retired in 1965, allowing Coates to win the seat. Robson died in 1975 in Lithgow.

References

 

1895 births
1975 deaths
Members of the New South Wales Legislative Assembly
Australian Labor Party members of the Parliament of New South Wales
20th-century Australian politicians